Cevat Güler (born 12 March 1959 in Perşembe, Ordu Province) is a Turkish former football player and coach.

Coaching career
After Karl Heinz Feldkamp resigned at the end of 2007–08 season, he took over the managership and became the first coach to win the Süper Lig by joining a club after the season start. Players of Galatasaray nicknamed him "father" after this success.

Following Michael Skibbe's managership control at Galatasaray, Cevat Güler became one of the assistant coaches of the Galatasaray football team. His contract was not expanded by the club after the arrival of Frank Rijkaard in 2009 summer.

Güler was appointed manager of Azerbaijani Premier League side Ravan Baku on 12 July 2012. He lasted six weeks before being sacked on 25 August 2012. In total he managed four games in the Azerbaijan Premier League drawing three and losing one. On 13 April 2013, Güler replaced Hector Cuper as manager of Süper Lig side Orduspor He lost his first game in charge on 20 April 2013 against Kasımpaşa.

Manager statistics

Honours 
Galatasaray
 Süper Lig: 2007–08

References

External links 
Profile at galatasaray.org
Coach profile at TFF

1959 births
Living people
People from Perşembe
Turkish footballers
Association footballers not categorized by position
Beşiktaş J.K. footballers
Turkish football managers
Galatasaray S.K. (football) non-playing staff
Galatasaray S.K. (football) managers
Ravan Baku FK managers
Orduspor managers
Süper Lig managers
Turkish expatriate football managers
Turkish expatriate sportspeople in Azerbaijan
Expatriate football managers in Azerbaijan